1914 in philosophy

Events

Births
 May 14 – Teodor Oizerman (died 2017)

Deaths
 April 19 – Charles Sanders Peirce (born 1839) 
 June 23 – Bhaktivinoda Thakur, Indian philosopher and guru (born 1838)
 October 27 – Theodor Lipps, German philosopher (born 1851)

References

Philosophy
20th-century philosophy
Philosophy by year